St Joseph's, Doora-Barefield is a Gaelic Athletic Association club in the parish of Doora-Barefield outside Ennis, County Clare, Ireland. Hurling was the more popular sport in Barefield over Gaelic football, now it's 50-50 between the both of them. Their main playing fields are in Gurteen. They have three full-size hurling and football pitches. There is also changing and showering facilities there.

History
Players from the club twice joined up with local rivals Éire Óg, Ennis to form the Ennis Faughs football team. Both clubs were competing at lower levels at the time so it was seen as an opportunity to play senior football. Between 1944-1956 and 1994-1995, the Ennis Faughs competed in thirteen county football finals, winning five Senior Football titles in 1947, 1948, 1952, 1954 and 1994. They also won an Intermediate Hurling title in 1945, and an Intermediate Football title in 1946.

The club's most recent successes were both in 2022, when they won the Clare Intermediate Hurling Championship, and their second team won the Clare Junior A Hurling Championship.

Major honours

Hurling
 All-Ireland Senior Club Hurling Championship (1): 1999
 Munster Senior Club Hurling Championship (2): 1998, 1999
 Clare Senior Hurling Championship (5): 1954, 1958, 1998, 1999, 2001
 Clare Intermediate Hurling Championship (4): 1985, 1993, 2016, 2022
 Clare Junior A Hurling Championship (5): 1952, 1960, 1983, 2000, 2022
 Clare Under-21 A Hurling Championship (2): 1993, 1994

Gaelic Football
 Clare Senior Football Championship (1): 1898 (as Doora)
 Clare Intermediate Football Championship (2): 1997, 2020
 Clare Junior A Football Championship (2): 1989, 1993
 Clare Under-21 A Football Championship (1): 2008

Notable players
Some of Clare GAA's greatest players have played for St Joseph's, many of which played with the iconic 1995 All Ireland winning team. These include Jamesie O'Connor, Seánie McMahon and Ollie Baker. All have won two All-Ireland Senior Championship medals, Seánie McMahon  and Jamesie O'Connor won the GAA All Star Player Of The Year Award for 1995 and 1997 respectively.

References

External links
Doora Barefield site

Hurling clubs in County Clare
Gaelic football clubs in County Clare
Gaelic games clubs in County Clare